This is a list of all teams that played in the Scottish Premier League from its formation in 1998, through its 2013 merger with the Scottish Football League (forming the Scottish Professional Football League, with the Scottish Premiership becoming the league system's top tier). Founder members are in italics.

List of clubs

Notes 

 
Clubs